The Ballymacarrett rail crash of 1871 occurred on 13 May 1871 at the Ballymacarrett Junction of the Belfast and County Down Railway in Belfast, Ireland. Two people were killed with 55 injured. The cause was a derailment caused by an intoxicated fireman who drove a steam locomotive with four goods wagons off the end of incomplete set of points at Ballymacarrett Junction blocking the main line. Another train came along and struck the first.

Notes

1871 in Ireland
Transport in County Down
Transport in Belfast
Railway accidents in 1871
Derailments in Northern Ireland
19th century in County Down
Train collisions in Northern Ireland
Accidents and incidents involving Belfast and County Down Railway
May 1871 events
1871 disasters in Ireland
1871 disasters in the United Kingdom